Ramandeep Singh (born 1 April 1993) is an Indian field hockey player who plays as a forward. He was named in the Indian squad for the 2016 Summer Olympics.

References

External links
Ramandeep Singh at Hockey India

1993 births
Living people
Sportspeople from Gurdaspur district
Indian male field hockey players
Field hockey players from Punjab, India
Field hockey players at the 2014 Commonwealth Games
Field hockey players at the 2014 Asian Games
Field hockey players at the 2016 Summer Olympics
Olympic field hockey players of India
Commonwealth Games medallists in field hockey
Commonwealth Games silver medallists for India
Asian Games gold medalists for India
Medalists at the 2014 Asian Games
Asian Games medalists in field hockey
Male field hockey forwards
Uttar Pradesh Wizards players
Medallists at the 2014 Commonwealth Games